John Brullaghhaun (John O'Brolchain) was an Irish prelate of the Roman Catholic Church in the mid 18th century.

Brullaghhaun was born in County Londonderry.  He was educated at Douai, Flanders. He served as Bishop of Derry from 1749 until his death a year later.

References

1750 deaths
18th-century Roman Catholic bishops in Ireland
Roman Catholic bishops of Derry
Year of birth unknown